Segal Building is located in Atlantic City, Atlantic County, New Jersey, United States. The building was built in 1920 and added to the National Register of Historic Places on February 9, 1984.

See also
National Register of Historic Places listings in Atlantic County, New Jersey

References

Neoclassical architecture in New Jersey
Buildings and structures completed in 1920
Buildings and structures in Atlantic City, New Jersey
National Register of Historic Places in Atlantic County, New Jersey
New Jersey Register of Historic Places
1920 establishments in New Jersey
Commercial buildings on the National Register of Historic Places in New Jersey